William Ferguson was a Scottish professional association footballer who played as an outside left. He won the Scottish Football League title in 1895–96 while playing with Celtic, and in the same year represented the Scottish Football League XI and played in two international trial matches, but a full cap for Scotland never came his way. He then moved to England to join Burnley in early 1897.

References

Year of birth unknown
Year of death missing
Scottish footballers
Association football outside forwards
Maryhill F.C. players
Celtic F.C. players
Burnley F.C. players
Manchester City F.C. players
English Football League players
Scottish Junior Football Association players
Scottish Football League players
Scottish Football League representative players